SS  Arcadia was a passenger liner built for P&O in 1953 to service the UK to Australia route. Towards the end of her life she operated as a cruise ship, based in Sydney, until scrapped in 1979.

History
[[File:Arcadia bell.jpg|thumb|upright|left|SS Arcadia'''s bell]]
The Arcadia was built for P&O by John Brown & Company at Clydebank in Scotland, at an estimated cost of  £5 million; her keel was laid in 1952 and she was launched on 14 May 1953, just a couple of hours after the Orsova of the associated Orient Line went down the ways at Barrow in Furness. Her maiden voyage commenced on 22 February 1954, sailing from Tilbury in the UK to Fremantle in Western Australia via the Suez Canal, Aden, Bombay and Colombo. Arcadia had a virtually identical sister in the Belfast-built SS Iberia.

Following the return trip to Australia, Arcadia made a series of cruises from Southampton before embarking for Australia again in October 1954. This mix of liner and cruise trade was expanded in 1959 when Arcadia made her first cruise voyage from an Australian port, sailing from Sydney on a short cruise in November and then to San Francisco in December.

As the number of passengers travelling by ship to Australia declined due to growth in air travel, P&O was expanding its cruise network. In 1959, Arcadia was refitted (with refurbished cabins and air-conditioning extended to all the accommodation) and throughout the 1960s continued the pattern of line voyages interspersed with cruises from Britain and Australia, including trans-Pacific routes, some of which took her through the Panama Canal. Following another refit in 1970, she became a full-time one-class cruise ship. For the next four years she worked the west coast of America, making a series of summer cruises to Alaska and winter cruises to Mexico. In 1975 Arcadia moved its base to Australia (replacing the Himalaya), making a final return trip to Britain and then cruising Asia-Pacific routes until in February 1979 she was delivered to a firm in Taiwan to be scrapped.

Unlike her sister, Arcadia was a reliable and popular ship and whereas Iberia was the first of the post war fleet to be scrapped (in 1972), Arcadia sailed on to be the last of these ships in service.

In 1974, when Arcadia sailed up the Columbia and Willamette Rivers to reach Portland, Oregon in the United States, on the first leg of a cruise from Vancouver to Hawaii, she was the largest passenger ship ever to have visited Portland up to that time. From 1975 until scrapped in Taiwan in 1979, her cruising role out of Sydney was full-time. She was replaced by P&O's then newly acquired Sea Princess, formerly the Kungsholm.

Incidents
While undocking at Tilbury in September 1954, the tug Cervia crossed Arcadia's wash while listing from the strain on the towline, and the combination caused the tug to capsize and sink with the loss of five of her eleven crew.

In June 1961 Arcadia hove to off Hawaii to embark a troupe of Polynesian dancers, and as she made way to dock failed to make the tight turn required and ran onto a coral reef, where she was stuck fast for two days but with little damage.

Two crew committed suicide by jumping overboard, in 1954 and 1971.

Battling strong winds on arriving at Tilbury in 1962, the anchor was lowered in an attempt to hold Arcadia in place. The wind turned the ship onto the anchor and a 19-foot hole was torn in the bow.

In the early hours of Friday 2 June 1978 the Arcadia ran into a wild storm coming back into Sydney and was hit by a rogue wave which caused extensive damage to the ship. It folded the life raft stairs in half. It also flooded the ship down to C Deck. Arcadia was sent back to Asia for repairs before it could sail again.

Popular cultureSS Arcadia appeared as stock footage in the 1964 Perry Mason episode "Nautical Knot", set near Acapulco, Mexico. The episode only shows the ship at the dockside, though its size near the pier makes an impression on the episode's characters.

A ship by the same name appears in the fifth Jurassic Park sequel, Jurassic World: Fallen Kingdom.  It is unclear what, if any, connection this ship has to the actual SS Arcadia.  In the film, the ship is used to evacuate genetically resurrected dinosaurs from their ill-fated island home due to a long dormant volcano becoming active again.

References

Sources
 SS Arcadia (Clydebuilt Ships Database)
 Arcadia of 1954 at Simplon Postcards
 Australian Migrant Ships 1946-1977,Peter Plowman, Rosenberg Publishing, 2006
 Home and Back - Australia's Golden Era of Passenger Ships, Stuart Bremer, Dreamweaver Books, 1984
 Pictorial Encyclopedia of Ocean Liners, 1860-1994'', William H. Miller, Dover Publications, 1995

Cruise ships
Ships of P&O (company)
Ships built on the River Clyde
1953 ships
Maritime incidents in 1961